Natallia Dziamidzenka (born 9 November 1983) is a retired Belarusian tennis player.

She won two doubles titles on the ITF Circuit in her career. On 4 October 2004, she reached her best singles ranking of world No. 340. On 11 October 2004, she peaked at No. 228 in the doubles rankings.

Partnering Anda Perianu, Dziamidzenka won her first $50k tournament in July 2005 at the ITF Louisville, defeating Teryn Ashley and Julie Ditty in the final.

ITF finals

Singles: 1 (0–1)

Doubles: 9 (2–7)

External links
 
 

1983 births
Living people
Tennis players from Minsk
Belarusian female tennis players
21st-century Belarusian women